Takahama Station is a name for several railroad stations in Japan.

Takahama Station (Ibaraki) - in Ibaraki Prefecture
Takahama Station (Shimane) - in Shimane Prefecture
Takahama Station (Ehime) - in Ehime Prefecture